The 1872 United States presidential election in New Jersey took place on November 5, 1872. All contemporary 37 states were part of the 1872 United States presidential election. The state voters chose nine electors to the Electoral College, which selected the president and vice president.

New Jersey was won by the Republican nominees, incumbent President Ulysses S. Grant of Illinois and his running mate Senator Henry Wilson of Massachusetts. Grant and Wilson defeated the Liberal Republican and Democratic nominees, former Congressman Horace Greeley of New York and his running mate former Senator and Governor Benjamin Gratz Brown of Missouri by a margin of 9.04%. 

This was the first time the Republicans won all the electoral votes of New Jersey, (see 1860 election in New Jersey for more information) as well as the popular vote. They would not win either again until 1896, 24 years later.

Results

See also
 United States presidential elections in New Jersey

References

New Jersey
1872
1872 New Jersey elections